Resistin-like beta is a protein that in humans is encoded by the RETNLB gene.

References

Further reading